The Anaktuvuk River is a river in Alaska's North Slope.  long, it flows west from glaciers in the Endicott Mountains changing direction just north of Anaktuvuk Pass to flow north to the Arctic Coastal Plain where it joins the Colville River. Its headwaters are formed by runoff from various glaciers in the Gates of the Arctic Wilderness on the slopes of Fan Mountain, Alapah Mountain and Limestack Mountain, the last of which lies on the watershed divide between the Arctic Coastal Plain and the Koyukuk River, and feeds the Anaktuvuk River via Graylime Creek.

 "The first geologic transect of the Arctic Slope was conducted during the summer of 1901 by USGS geologist F.C. Schrader and topographer W.J. Peters, who descended the Anaktuvuk River in canoes to its junction with the Colville River."  In 1938, Robert "Bob" Marshall explored the sources of the river.

Human use
Though the vast majority of the river is often inaccessible to motorized boats due to very low water levels, portions of the river provide excellent fishing ground for Arctic char and "monster grayling". Hunters may fly into the Anaktuvuk River drainage in summer to hunt moose, bears, caribou, and other animals. In August 2013, a hunter was severely mauled by a grizzly bear while hunting in the Anaktuvuk River drainage. Because of its low and fluctuating water levels, extreme remoteness, lack of airports, and challenging weather conditions, the Anaktuvuk River is only very rarely run by recreational boaters.

Wildlife
Because of its extremely remote location, the Anaktuvuk River remains in an almost completely unaltered wilderness state. Shrub forests areas along the middle and lower Anaktuvuk River provide some of the little moose habitat on the largely treeless North Slope region. The Anaktuvuk River drainage is also home to grizzly bears, caribou, wolves, and many small mammals. Migrating birds such as yellow-billed loons and Canada goose raise their young along the river.

See also
List of rivers of Alaska

References

Rivers of North Slope Borough, Alaska
Rivers of Alaska